India is a country in South Asia. It is the seventh-largest country by area, the second-most populous country (with over 1.2 billion people), and the most populous democracy in the world.

In 2019, the Indian economy was the world's fifth largest by nominal GDP and third largest by purchasing power parity. Following market-based economic reforms in 1991, India became one of the fastest-growing major economies and is considered a newly industrialised country.

For further information on the types of business entities in this country and their abbreviations, see: "Business entities in India".

Largest firms 

This list shows firms in the Fortune Global 500, which ranks firms by total revenues reported before 31 March 2020. Only the top ranking firms (if available) are included as a sample.

Notable firms 
This list includes notable companies with primary headquarters located in the country. The industry and sector follow the Industry Classification Benchmark taxonomy. Organizations which have ceased operations are included and noted as defunct.

See also 
  conglomerates in India
 Brand India
 Digital India
 India Inc.
 Look East policy
 Make in India
 MyGov.in

References 

 
India